This Bird Has Flown – A 40th Anniversary Tribute to the Beatles' Rubber Soul is a tribute album by a variety of artists that commemorates the 40th anniversary of the release of the Beatles' 1965 album Rubber Soul. It was released on October 25, 2005 by Razor & Tie. It follows the track listing of the UK version of the album, although the two songs added to the American release are available as bonus tracks on iTunes Music Store.

Reception

Writing for Allmusic, music critic Stephen Thomas Erlewine called Sufjan Stevens' cover of "What Goes On" the "only severe misstep" of the album and call the tribute "an album filled with good, generally pleasant covers that in no way replace the original Beatles versions but do offer as a nice reminder of what great songwriters Lennon, McCartney and Harrison were." Conversely, Rob Mitchum of Pitchfork Media called Stevens' performance "a surprisingly gritty jam" and of the album itself "if it gets anything right about the original Rubber Soul, it's in the sense of perfectly replicating the progenitor's unevenness."

Track listing
All tracks written by Lennon–McCartney, except where noted.

See also
I Am Sam

References

The Beatles tribute albums
2005 compilation albums
Razor & Tie compilation albums